Arctic Blue is a 1993 action thriller film directed by Peter Masterson and starring Rutger Hauer, Dylan Walsh, Rya Kihlstedt, and John Cuthbert.

Premise
Eric Desmond is an amateur marshal in the wilderness of Alaska who has to deal with a homicidal trapper Ben Corbett, his fellow trappers and a greedy politician.

Cast
 Rutger Hauer as Ben Corbett
 Dylan Walsh as Eric Desmond
 Rya Kihlstedt as Anne Marie
 John Cuthbert as Lemalle
 John Bear Curtis as Mitchell
 Bill Croft as Bob 'Viking' Corbett
 Richard Bradford as Sam Wilder
 Kevin Cooney as Leo Meyerling
 Michael Lawrenchuk as Earl Kenai
 Steven E. Miller as Arthur Neff
 Gunargie O'Sullivan as Dixie

VHS and DVD releases
The film was released on VHS in the U.S. in 1995 from Columbia TriStar. It was released on DVD in the U.S. in 2001.

See also
 3:10 to Yuma (1957 film), the first film adaptation directed by Delmer Daves and starring Glenn Ford (as Wade), Van Heflin (as Evans), and Felicia Farr (as Emmy).

External links 
 

Films directed by Peter Masterson
1993 films
1993 action thriller films
Films set in the Arctic
Films set in Alaska
Northern (genre) films
1990s English-language films